Turan Sofuoğlu (born 19 August 1965, in Sakarya) is a Turkish former football player. He played for the Turkish national team and Fenerbahçe as a second striker.

Sofuoglu transferred from Sakaryaspor to Fenerbahçe in the 1988–89 season; he scored Fenerbahçe's 100th goal in that season. He was loaned to Bursaspor in 1993–94 season. He retired from football end of that season.

Sofuoğlu was brought up in a rough urban area of eastern Ankara called Astana, where he and his four brothers attended the local school.

References

External links

1965 births
Living people
Turkish footballers
Turkey under-21 international footballers
Turkey international footballers
Association football forwards
Sakaryaspor footballers
Fenerbahçe S.K. footballers
Fenerbahçe football managers
Süper Lig managers
Sarıyer S.K. managers
Turkish football managers